Momofuku is an album released in 2008 by Elvis Costello and the Imposters.  The album features Rilo Kiley's frontwoman Jenny Lewis on harmony vocals on several tracks. The album title refers to Momofuku Ando, the inventor of instant ramen noodles, and the speed at which the album was conceived and created. It was first released on vinyl and as a digital download, then later released on CD.

Track listing

Charts

References

External links
 

2008 albums
Elvis Costello albums
Lost Highway Records albums
Roots rock albums
Albums produced by Elvis Costello